Statistical Science is a review journal published by the Institute of Mathematical Statistics. The founding editor was Morris H. DeGroot, who explained the mission of the journal in his 1986 editorial:

"A central purpose of Statistical Science is to convey the richness, breadth and unity of the field by presenting
the full range of contemporary statistical thought at a modest technical level accessible to the wide community
of practitioners, teachers, researchers and students of statistics and probability."

Editors 

 2017-2019	 	Cun-Hui Zhang
 2014-2016	 	Peter Green
 2011-2013	 	Jon Wellner
 2008-2010	 	David Madigan
 2005-2007	 	Ed George
 2002-2004	 	George Casella
 2001	 	        Morris Eaton
 2001	 	        Richard Tweedie
 1998-2000	 	Leon Gleser
 1995-1997	 	Paul Switzer
 1992-1994	 	Robert E. Kass
 1989-1991    	 	Carl N. Morris
 1985-1989  		Morris H. DeGroot

References

Further reading

External links
Statistical Science home page

Institute of Mathematical Statistics academic journals
Statistics journals
English-language journals
Publications established in 1986